American Gun is a 2005 American crime drama film produced by Participant Productions, IFC Films, IFC First Take, and Spirit Dance Entertainment. It was written in 2001 by Steven Bagatourian and Aric Avelino and directed by Avelino as his directorial debut.

Avelino attended Loyola Marymount University and made the film with many LMU alumni, including producer Ted Kroeber.

The film took two and a half years to finance. The central idea came from a "Column One" article in the Los Angeles Times. In addition, the writers were influenced by a friend from the Chicago school district who related stories about how students brought guns to school, not to use them on campus, but because of the dangerous neighborhoods they live in or walk through to attend classes. Avelino was very appreciative of the directorial advice of Forest Whitaker, one of the film's producers. The first actress attached to the project was Marcia Gay Harden.

Premise
American Gun centers around three stories dealing with the results of gun use: an inner city school principal (Whitaker), a single mother (Harden), and an A student (Cardellini) who works at her family's gun shop.

Cast
 Marcia Gay Harden – Janet Huttenson
 Forest Whitaker – Carter
 Donald Sutherland – Carl Wilk
 Lisa Long – Sandra Cohen
 Arlen Escarpeta – Jay
 Chris Warren Jr. – Marcus
 David Heymann – Producer
 Chris Marquette – David Huttenson
 Amanda Seyfried – Mouse
 Nikki Reed – Tally
 Joseph Kell – Security Guard
 Tony Goldwyn – Frank
 Rex Linn – Earl
 Kevin Phillips – Reggie
 Davenia McFadden – Felicia
 Linda Cardellini – Mary Ann Wilk
 Schuyler Fisk – Cicily
 Michael Shannon (as Michael J. Shannon) – Jerry
 Charles Duckworth – Connie
 Todd Tesen – Barry
 Melissa Leo – Louise
 Gary Paul Clark – Supervisor
 Ali Hillis - Gun Shop Patron
 Garcelle Beauvais (as Garcelle Beauvais-Nilon) – Sarah

Reception 
On review aggregator website Rotten Tomatoes, the film holds an approval rating of 39% based on 31 critic reviews, with an average rating of 5.30/10. The site's critics consensus reads, "Despite its intriguing premise, this earnest anti-gun polemic is too melodramatic to resonate." According to Metacritic, which compiled 14 reviews and calculated a weighted average score of 48 out of 100, the film received "mixed or average reviews".

Distribution
According to boxofficemojo.com, American Gun took in $24,098 in a limited release from one to six theatres in a little over 10 weeks in theatres from March 22 – June 1, 2006.  It was featured on the IFC program First Take.

Awards
Independent Spirit Awards Nominations
Best Feature, Ted Kroeber, producer.
Best Male Lead, Forest Whitaker.
Best Supporting Female, Marcia Gay Harden.

References

External links 
 
 
 LMU alumni press release about the movie.
 American Gun official site
 IFC "First Take".

2005 films
2005 crime drama films
American crime drama films
American independent films
2000s English-language films
Films set in Chicago
Films shot in Chicago
IFC Films films
Participant (company) films
2005 directorial debut films
2005 independent films
2000s American films